Strezhevoy Airport (also Strezhevoy Southeast Airport or Strezhovoy Airport)  is an airport in Russia located 4 km southeast of Strezhevoy. It contains a large tarmac (400 x 100 m) laid out in a civilian use configuration, and services small transports.  It is possible that the airfield was designed for military use during the Cold War.

Airlines and destinations

References

Airports built in the Soviet Union
Airports in Tomsk Oblast